What Have I Done to Deserve This? is a 1984 Spanish black comedy film written and directed by Pedro Almodóvar. The title is sometimes given with an exclamation mark at the end rather than a question mark. Starring Carmen Maura, Ángel de Andrés López, Chus Lampreave and Verónica Forqué, the film follows the misadventures of an overworked housewife and her dysfunctional family. Almodóvar has described What Have I Done as a homage to Italian neorealism, although this tribute also involves jokes about paedophilia, prostitution, and a telekinetic child.

Plot
Gloria, a downtrodden housewife, lives with her husband Antonio, mother-in-law and two sons in a small, shabby and overcrowded apartment located by the Madrid motorway. Besides taking care of her home and family, Gloria also works as a cleaning lady to make ends meet and takes amphetamines to keep going. Her marriage to Antonio, a taxi driver, is on the rocks. Fifteen years earlier, in Germany, Antonio worked as a driver for Ingrid Muller, a German singer with whom he had a brief affair. His only mementos of their liaison are a signed photograph and a tape of her song Nur nicht Aus Liebe Weinen which he constantly plays and which Gloria detests. Antonio's services for Ingrid involved copying letters that she had allegedly received from Hitler himself. In his taxi, Antonio meets the writer Lucas and Antonio casually mentions this fact to Lucas, who suggests that they forge Hitler's diaries for a big profit.

There is also a book of Ingrid's memoirs written by a friend which contains letters from Hitler which Antonio helped forge. Antonio is trying to teach the art of forgery to one of his sons, as this talent will be his only inheritance. The younger son, Miguel, who is twelve, sleeps around with older men. When Gloria confronts Miguel, telling him she knows he has been sleeping with older men (including his friend's father), Miguel responds: "I'm the master of my own body." Gloria's eldest son, Toni, who is fourteen, wants to become a farmer and is saving up enough money to buy a farm by peddling heroin. The grandmother, who is addicted to soft drinks, shares the same dream of returning to her native village. Gloria's friends are her two neighbors: Cristal and Juani. Cristal is a prostitute with a heart of gold. Juani, is a bitter woman obsessed with cleanliness and vulgar ornaments, her daughter, Vanessa, has  telekinetic powers, which she uses to destroy their apartment.

Gloria's life has become unbearable. She has no hope, no money, no opportunities yet she is still required to pay for the apartment, the television, the telephone, the lighting, the heating, the rates, and the weekly shopping. Increasingly desperate to find extra money to pay the bills, she is forced to work for a couple of bankrupt writers; she has to put up with a lizard that Toni and his grandmother have brought home. Unable to pay for Miguel's dental treatment, Gloria has little hesitation in allowing Miguel to live with the dentist, a pedophile. Miguel accepts once certain material conditions are met.

Refused sedatives by a pharmacist without a prescription, the defeated Gloria returns home to find her husband preparing to take Ingrid Muller for a drive. An argument ensues, Antonio slaps Gloria, and she strikes him on the head with a leg of ham. Hitting his neck on the sink, he dies instantly. The police investigation does not discover Gloria's guilt. Toni and his grandmother leave Madrid for her village. Abandoned, Gloria contemplates committing suicide. She changes her mind when her son Miguel returns unexpectedly and says he wants to take care of her.

Cast
 Carmen Maura as Gloria: housewife and cleaning woman 
 Ángel de Andrés López as Antonio: Gloria's husband, taxi driver and forger of letters
 Juan Martínez as Toni: their 14-year-old son and drug dealer
 Miguel Ángel Herranz as Miguel: their 12-year-old son
 Chus Lampreave as Grandmother: Antonio's mother who lives with them
 Verónica Forqué as Cristal: prostitute who lives in the same apartment block
 Kiti Manver as Juani: dressmaker who lives in the same apartment block
 Sonia Hohmann as Vanessa: Juani's daughter with telekinetic powers
 Gonzalo Suárez as Lucas Villalba: writer who meets Antonio in a taxi
 Amparo Soler Leal as Patricia: Villalba's wife
 Katia Loritz as Ingrid Müller: German woman, Antonio's former girlfriend 
 Luis Hostalot as Polo: Policeman with erectile dysfunction
 Javier Gurruchaga as Dentist who wants to adopt Miguel
 Cecilia Roth as Woman in TV commercial
 Pedro Almodóvar as Playback 'La bien pagá'
 Tinín Almodóvar as Bank teller
 Carlitos as Dinero ("Money"): lizard

Background

What Have I Done, Almodovar's fourth film, became the first of his works to be released theatrically in the U.S. premiering to sold-out crowds as part of New Directors/New Films series, co-sponsored by the New York Film Festival and the Film Department of the Museum of Modern Art. The film, set in the tower blocks around Madrid, depicts female frustration and family breakdown, echoing Jean-Luc Godard's Two or Three Things I Know About Her and strong story plots from  Roald Dahl's Lamb to the Slaughter and  Truman Capote's "A Day's Work" but with Almodóvar's unique approach to filmmaking. Technically, What Have I Done? is deliberately crude and the production values raw, a combined result of the film's low-budget as well as Almodovar's relative lack of experience. But the film's shabby look is in tune with the tale's squalid realistic context and social class of its protagonists. What Have I Done? was  critically much better received than Almodovar's three previous films and put him on the movie map in America as a major talent to watch.

References

External links
 
 
 

1984 films
1984 comedy-drama films
1984 independent films
1984 LGBT-related films
1984 multilingual films
1980s black comedy films
1980s English-language films
1980s French-language films
1980s German-language films
1980s Spanish-language films
English-language Spanish films
Films about dysfunctional families
Films directed by Pedro Almodóvar
Films scored by Bernardo Bonezzi
Films set in apartment buildings
Films set in Madrid
Films shot in Madrid
LGBT-related black comedy films
LGBT-related comedy-drama films
Mariticide in fiction
Social realism in film
Spanish black comedy films
Spanish comedy-drama films
Spanish independent films
Spanish LGBT-related films
Spanish multilingual films